WEC 33: Marshall vs. Stann was a mixed martial arts (MMA) event held by World Extreme Cagefighting (WEC) that took place on Wednesday, March 26, 2008.

Background
A rematch for the WEC Middlweight Championship between champion Paulo Filho and Chael Sonnen was advertised for this event, but Filho dropped out three weeks prior to the fight for personal reasons. Sonnen remained on the card, and instead faced Bryan Baker, who was pulled from an undercard bout with Logan Clark to face Sonnen. Clark's new opponent was WEC newcomer Scott Harper. The Filho/Sonnen rematch was later rescheduled for WEC 36 in November 2008.

The event drew an estimated 549,000 viewers on Versus.

Results

Reported payout 
The following is the reported payout to the fighters as reported to the Nevada State Athletic Commission. It does not include sponsor money or "locker room" bonuses often given by the WEC.

Brian Stann: $18,000 (includes $9,000 win bonus) def. Doug Marshall: $10,000
Chael Sonnen: $34,000 ($17,000 win bonus) def. Bryan Baker: $5,000
Marcus Hicks: $10,000 ($5,000 win bonus) def. Ed Ratcliff: $7,000
Steve Cantwell: $8,000 ($4,000 win bonus) def. Tim McKenzie: $6,000
Hiromitsu Miura: $8,000 ($4,000 win bonus) def. Blas Avena: $6,000
Brock Larson: $24,000 ($12,000 win bonus) def. John Alessio: $15,000
Rich Crunkilton: $20,000 ($10,000 win bonus) def. Sergio Gomez $4,000
Alex Serdyukov: $12,000 ($6,000 win bonus) def. Ryan Stonitsch: $3,000
Chris Manuel:  $3,000 vs. Kenji Osawa: $5,000 ^
Logan Clark: $12,000 ($6,000 win bonus) def. Scott Harper: $3,000

^Both fighters earned show money; bout declared majority draw.

See also 
 World Extreme Cagefighting
 List of World Extreme Cagefighting champions
 List of WEC events
 2008 in WEC

External links
Official WEC website

References

World Extreme Cagefighting events
2008 in mixed martial arts
Mixed martial arts in Las Vegas
2008 in sports in Nevada
Hard Rock Hotel and Casino (Las Vegas)